Jamalganj is an upazila of Sunamganj District in the Division of Sylhet, Bangladesh.

Geography
It has 18119 households and total area 338.74 km2. Jamalganj Upazila is bounded by Tahirpur and bishwamvarpur upazilas on the north, khaliajuri and derai upazilas on the south, sunamganj sadar upazila on the east, mohanganj and dharmapasha upazilas on the west. Main rivers are Nawa Gang, Baulai and Dhanu; Pakna Haor and Hail Haor are also notable. Patilachura, Pangna, Lamba, Baska, Chhatidhara and Kachma beels are noted.

Demographics
As of the 1991 Bangladesh census, Jamalganj has a population of 107,771. Males constitute 51.75% of the population, and females 48.25%. This Upazila's eighteen up population is 53158. Jamalganj has an average literacy rate of 20.1% (7+ years), and the national average of 32.4% literate.

History
Little is known about the ancient history of Jamalganj. The Arabic word "jamal" means pleasant and beautiful and the word "ganj" means market or where buying and selling takes place. "Ganj" also means city. In that sense, Jamalganj is a beautiful city.

Economy
The people of Jamalganj upazila live mainly on the basis of agricultural economy. There are many haors and rivers in Jamalganj. Many people make a living by fishing from open haors, especially during the rainy season. Besides, government revenue also comes from rivers, canals and beels. The Surma River flows along the middle of Jamalganj.

Administration
Jamalganj thana was established in 1940 and was turned into an upazila in 1984.

Jamalganj Upazila is divided into five union parishads: Beheli, Bhimkhali, Fenerbak, Jamalganj, and Sachnabazar. The union parishads are subdivided into 97 mauzas and 192 villages.

Jamalganj (Town) consists of 3 mouzas. It has an area of 11.58 km2. The town has a population of 14968; male 53.12%, female 46.88%; density of population is 1292 per km2. Literacy rate among the town people is 26.7%.Population 107771; male 51.75%, female 48.25%; Muslim 78.92%, Hindu 21.00%, Buddhist, Christian and others 0.08%.

Chairmen

(UNO) Upazila Nirbahi Officers

Education

Colleges 
 Jamalganj Govt. College, Jamalganj

Secondary schools 

|9
|Al-haj Jhunu Mia High School
|1 January 2010

See also
 Districts of Bangladesh
 Sub-Districts of Bangladesh
 Divisions of Bangladesh
 Unions of Bangladesh

References

Upazilas of Sunamganj District